Thialbarbital (Intranarcon) is a barbiturate derivative invented in the 1960s. It has sedative effects, and was used primarily for induction in surgical anaesthesia. Thialbarbital is short acting and has less of a tendency to induce respiratory depression than other barbiturate derivatives such as pentobarbital.

Synthesis

See also
Thiamylal

References 

Thiobarbiturates
GABAA receptor positive allosteric modulators
Allyl compounds
Cyclohexenes